Pandea conica is a species of hydrozoan in the family Pandeidae.

References

Pandeidae
Animals described in 1827